Fukurō no Shiro (梟の城, Owls' Castle) is the ninja-themed 1959 debut novel of Japanese author Ryōtarō Shiba, which won him the Naoki Prize in 1960 after the story was published by Kodansha. It has been adapted into a 3-part "Naoki Award Series" TV broadcast on the Fuji Television Network in 1960, and into two jidaigeki-genre films, Castle of Owls in 1963 and Owls' Castle in 1999.

Film adaptations

Castle of Owls

, literally "Owls' Castle Ninja Secret Handbook", also known as Samurai Spies (not to be confused with the unrelated film Samurai Spy), is a 1963 Japanese adaptation directed by Eiichi Kudō. It starred Ryūtarō Ōtomo in the lead role.

Cast 
 Ryūtarō Ōtomo as Juzo
 Minoru Ōki as Gohei
 Hizuru Takachiho as Kohagi
 Chiyoko Honma as Kizaru
 Choichiro Kawarazaki as Kumotaro
 Kantarō Suga as Maeda Geni

Owls' Castle 

 is a 1999 Japanese adaptation directed by Masahiro Shinoda starring Kiichi Nakai.

See also 

Kaze no Bushi
Kunitori Monogatari Taiga drama : Shigeru Tsuyuguchi played Tsuzura Juzō

References

External links 

Castle of Owls - Vintage Ninja
 Comparison between original film (Castle of Owls) and the remake

1959 Japanese novels
1959 debut novels
1963 films
1960s adventure drama films
1960s Japanese-language films
Japanese historical novels
Japanese novels adapted into films
Novels by Ryōtarō Shiba
Jidaigeki
Jidaigeki films
Ninja films
Ninja fiction
1963 romantic drama films
Toei Company films
Films with screenplays by Ichirô Ikeda
1960s Japanese films